"Ultra Lover" is the third Japanese single by South Korean boy band 2PM. It was released on November 2, 2011 in 3 editions: CD+DVD, CD+Photobook and a Regular edition. The single was released along with the group's second live DVD "1st Japan Tour 2011 "Take Off" in Makuhari Messe". The single ranked #4 in Oricon's Weekly chart.

Composition 
"Ultra Lover" is an original Japanese song. The B-side is a Japanese version of their Korean song "I'll Be Back", which served as the lead single of their EP Still 2:00PM.

Music video 
A teaser of the music video was released on October 1, into 2PM's official Japanese website and the full music video on October 9. It premiered on the Japanese TV network Space Shower TV. In the choreography scenes of the music video, the member Taecyeon doesn't appear. Taecyeon was hurt during opening tour of 2PM's Asia tour in Seoul.

Promotions 
The group made the first performance of the song on the show Happy Music in November 12. The group made other performance of the song on the show Music Fair in November 26.

Certifications 
For December 2011, Ultra Lover is certified Gold for selling over 100,000+ by RIAJ. Making it their first single with this certification in Japan.

Track listing

Charts

Oricon

Other Charts

Sales and certifications

Release history

References

External links
 Official Website

2011 singles
Dance-pop songs
Japanese-language songs
2PM songs
2011 songs
Ariola Japan singles